Cynthia Annice "Cindy" Goodwin (born June 3, 1952 in Newport News, Virginia) is an American retired slalom canoeist who competed in the 1970s. She finished 14th in the K-1 event at the 1972 Summer Olympics in Munich. Now Cynthia Wall, she is currently a retired chemistry teacher at Tuscarora High School in Leesburg, Virginia.

References
Sports-reference.com profile

1952 births
American female canoeists
Canoeists at the 1972 Summer Olympics
Living people
Olympic canoeists of the United States
People from Newport News, Virginia
21st-century American women